Mark Fraser (born 30 September 1959) is a former Australian rules footballer who played with South Melbourne in the Victorian Football League (VFL).

Notes

External links 

Living people
1959 births
Australian rules footballers from New South Wales
Sydney Swans players